Marcus McMillan (born 5 May 1995) is a Scottish professional footballer who currently plays as a midfielder for Hong Kong Premier League club HKFC.

Club career
Having started his career with Hearts and Aberdeen, McMillan was signed by Celtic in June 2005. However, he was released only months later for sporting a Liverpool-inspired haircut.

Following his release from Celtic, McMillan found himself back at Hearts, but was released in the summer of 2013. He then joined Airdrieonians on an amateur contract, playing with their under-20 side. He made one appearance for The Diamonds, coming on as a substitute for Kyle Richford in a 2–0 cup defeat to Queen of the South.

Career statistics

Club

Notes

References

External links
 Yau Yee Football League profile

Living people
1995 births
People from Cumbernauld
Scottish footballers
Association football midfielders
Scottish Professional Football League players
Hong Kong First Division League players
Hong Kong Premier League players
West of Scotland Football League players
Heart of Midlothian F.C. players
Aberdeen F.C. players
Celtic F.C. players
Airdrieonians F.C. players
Hong Kong FC players
Scottish expatriate footballers
Scottish expatriate sportspeople in Hong Kong
Expatriate footballers in Hong Kong
Footballers from North Lanarkshire